Mesivta Zichron Baruch,, established in 2007 and, also known as Mesivta of Clifton, is an Orthodox Jewish high school in Clifton, New Jersey led by Rabbi Halberstadt.

As of the 2017–18 school year, the school had an enrollment of 63 students and 11.8 classroom teachers (on an FTE basis), for a student–teacher ratio of 5.3:1. The school's student body was 100% White.

Location
The school occupies a two-story brick building (originally built as a fire station) at 338 Delawanna Avenue. The mesivta purchased this property for $900,000 from The Jewish Education Alliance in July 2007.

References

2007 establishments in New Jersey
Boys' schools in New Jersey
Clifton, New Jersey
Educational institutions established in 2007
Jewish schools in the United States
Mesivtas
Orthodox yeshivas in New Jersey
Private high schools in Passaic County, New Jersey